Road Transport and Highways Division is a Bangladeshi government division under the Ministry of Road Transport and Bridges responsible for roads and highways. The department is headed by A B M Amin Ullah Nuri.

History
Road Transport and Highways Division signed an agreement with the government of Japan worth 88 billion Taka to build three bridges and one flyover. The department drafted the Road Transport Act in 2017 which was subsequently approved by the cabinet of Bangladesh.

References

Organisations based in Dhaka
Government departments of Bangladesh